The Rock Cabin is in North Cascades National Park, in the U.S. state of Washington. Constructed by trapper John Dayo in the 1920s, the cabin was placed on the National Register of Historic Places in 1989.

Rock Cabin is a three-sided wood cabin which was built against a cliff, with one side of the cabin being the cliff face. The cabin has saddle-notched corners and a wood shake roof which abuts the cliff face. The shelter is on the Fisher Creek trail.

References

Houses on the National Register of Historic Places in Washington (state)
Houses completed in 1925
Buildings and structures in Skagit County, Washington
National Register of Historic Places in North Cascades National Park
Log cabins in the United States
National Register of Historic Places in Skagit County, Washington
Log buildings and structures on the National Register of Historic Places in Washington (state)